The Japan women's national under-17 football team is a national association football youth team of Japan and is controlled by the Japan Football Association. It has reached the World Cup Finals on three times and won the 2014 editions.

Results and fixtures

Legend

2022

Fixtures & Results (2022), JFA.jp

U-15

Fixtures & Results (2022)

2023

U-16

Fixtures & Results (2023)

Coaching staff

Current coaching staff

Players

Current U-17 squad
The following players were called-up for the 2022 FIFA U-17 Women's World Cup, held in October 2022.

Current U-16 squad
The following players were called-up for the JENESYS U-17 Women's Football Memorial Cup held from 16 to 21 March 2023, held at the Okinawa Prefecture.

Current U-15 squad
The following U-15 players were named for the 2022 Balcom BMW Cup, also known this year as Prayer for Peace; Hiroshima International Youth Soccer Games 2022, held in August.

Previous U-17 squads
2018 FIFA U-17 Women's World Cup
2016 FIFA U-17 Women's World Cup
2014 FIFA U-17 Women's World Cup
2012 FIFA U-17 Women's World Cup
2010 FIFA U-17 Women's World Cup
2008 FIFA U-17 Women's World Cup

Competitive record

FIFA U-17 Women's World Cup

*Draws include knockout matches decided on penalty kicks.

AFC U-17 Women's Asian Cup

*Draws include knockout matches decided on penalty kicks.

See also

Women's
International footballers
National football team (Results)
National under-20 football team
National under-17 football team
National futsal team
Men's
International footballers
National football team (Results (2020–present))
National under-23 football team
National under-20 football team
National under-17 football team
National futsal team
National under-20 futsal team
National beach soccer team

References

External links
 Official website, JFA.jp 
 Japan national team 2021 schedule at JFA.jp 

Asian women's national under-17 association football teams
Football